Naveen Kumar may refer to:

 Naveen Kumar (athlete) (born 1988), Indian athlete
 Naveen Kumar (musician) (born 1965), Indian flautist
 Naveen Kumar (footballer), Indian goalkeeper
 Navin Kumar (born 1952), Indian civil servant
 Naveen Kumar (kabaddi) (born 2000), Indian kabaddi player